Olenecamptus optatus is a species of beetle in the family Cerambycidae. It was described by Pascoe in 1866. It is known from Thailand, Singapore, Malaysia, Sumatra, Vietnam.

Subspecies
 Olenecamptus optatus optatoides Dillon & Dillon, 1948
 Olenecamptus optatus optatus Pascoe, 1866

References

Dorcaschematini
Beetles described in 1866